Charoen Rat is a tambon (subdistrict) of Mae Chai District, in Phayao Province, Thailand. In 2020 it had a total population of 3,807 people.

The subdistrict is in the northwestern part of the province not far from the border with Chiang Rai Province. It lies along the National Road 1 (Phahon Yothin Road) and is connected by road to Pa Faek in the north and Mae Chai and Phayao in the south.

History
The subdistrict was created effective August 1, 1988 by splitting off 8 administrative villages from Pa Faek.

Administration

Central administration
The tambon is subdivided into 8 administrative villages (muban).

Local administration
The whole area of the subdistrict is covered by the subdistrict municipality (Thesaban Tambon) Charoen Rat (เทศบาลตำบลเจริญราษฎร์).

References

External links
Thaitambon.com on Charoen Rat

Tambon of Phayao province
Populated places in Phayao province